Minuscule 39 (in the Gregory-Aland numbering), A140 (Von Soden), is a Greek minuscule manuscript of the New Testament, written on vellum. Palaeographically it has been assigned to the 11th century. It has complex contents and some marginalia.

Description 

The codex contains a complete text of the four Gospels on 288 parchment leaves. Gospels of Matthew and Mark were written by different hands.

There is also a division according to the smaller Ammonian Sections (in Mark 241, the last section in 16:20).

It has a commentary, in Mark commentary of Victorinus, from the same original as in codex 34.

It does not contains the texts of Matthew 16:2b–3 and the Pericope Adulterae (John 7:53-8:11).

Text 

The Greek text of the codex is a representative of the Byzantine text-type. Aland placed it in Category V. It was not examined by using the Claremont Profile Method.

History 

The manuscript was written in Constantinople by the Patriarch Sergius II (999-1019), in the beginning of the 11th century. In 1218 it was brought by monk Makarius to the Athos.

It was examined and described by Scholz, Burgon, and Paulin Martin.

The manuscript was added to the list of the New Testament manuscripts by Wettstein. C. R. Gregory saw the manuscript in 1885.

It is currently housed at the Bibliothèque nationale de France (Coislin Gr. 23) at Paris.

See also 

 List of New Testament minuscules
 Biblical manuscripts
 Textual criticism

Notes

References 

Greek New Testament minuscules
11th-century biblical manuscripts
Fonds Coislin